France competed at the 2022 World Games held in Birmingham, United States from 7 to 17 July 2022. Athletes representing France won 11 gold medals, 15 silver medals and 16 bronze medals. The country finished in 5th place in the medal table.

Medalists

Invitational sports

Competitors
The following is the list of number of competitors in the Games.

Aerobic gymnastics

France competed in aerobic gymnastics.

Air sports

France won two gold medals in air sports.

Archery

France won one silver medal in archery.

Artistic roller skating

France competed in artistic roller skating.

Boules sports

France won two medals in boules sports.

Bowling

France competed in bowling.

Canoe marathon

France competed in canoe marathon.

Canoe polo

France won two medals in canoe polo.

Dancesport

France won one bronze medal in dancesport.

Duathlon

France won four medals in duathlon.

Finswimming

France competed in finswimming.

Flag football

France competed in flag football.

Flying disc

France competed in the flying disc competition.

Inline hockey

France won the bronze medal in the inline hockey tournament.

Ju-jitsu

France won five medals in ju-jitsu.

Karate

France won one bronze medal in karate.

Men

Women

Lifesaving

France won four medals in lifesaving.

Muaythai

France won one silver medal in muaythai.

Powerlifting

France won one bronze medal in powerlifting.

Road speed skating

France won five medals in road speed skating.

Sport climbing

France won one bronze medal in sport climbing.

Squash

France won three medals in squash.

Track speed skating

France won three medals in track speed skating.

Trampoline gymnastics

France won two medals in trampoline gymnastics.

Water skiing

France won two bronze medals in water skiing.

Wushu

France won one bronze medal in wushu.

References

Nations at the 2022 World Games
2022
World Games